Sankha Park is a park near Chappal Karkhana, Kathmandu. The residents visit the park for picnicking, meeting and morning walk. The park is managed by Kathmandu Metropolitan City. This park is situated beside a busy ring road and offers solace to the many passers-by from the pollution and heat of the city.

References

Parks in Nepal
Tourist attractions in Kathmandu